Arts House is a centre for contemporary performance and interactive artforms in Melbourne, Australia. Established in 2006, it is a program of the City of Melbourne.

It supports and presents a range of experimental theatre, live art, contemporary dance and similar types of performance, by Australian and international artists.

Arts House operates at two heritage venues in North Melbourne: the North Melbourne Town Hall and the Meat Market.

References

External links
Official website

Performing arts in Melbourne
Performance art venues
Dance venues in Australia